Rafail Sgouros (born 28 May 2004) is a Greek professional footballer who plays as a midfielder for Super League club Aris.

References

2004 births
Living people
Greek footballers
Super League Greece players
Aris Thessaloniki F.C. players
Association football midfielders
Footballers from Naousa, Imathia